Pervomaiskyi is a city in Lozova Raion, Kharkiv Oblast (province) of Ukraine, formerly known as Likhachove. It is the fourth largest city in Kharkiv Oblast. Pervomaiskyi hosts the administration of Pervomaiskyi urban hromada, one of the hromadas of Ukraine. Population:  

The city is known for Khimprom, one of the biggest chemical factories in the former USSR.  The city has lush green plots and parks, a cultural center named "DK Khimik" and a stadium also named "Khimik".

History
In 1869 a railway was opened, Kursk-Kharkov-Sevastopol. In August of the same year a whistle stop was built 80 kilometres from Kharkov. Trains stopped for water and firewood and the station was named Likhachevo, in honour of a squire Likhachov, whose estate was near a village Sivash in a few kilometres from the railway. Water was supplied from lake Sivash and a water-tower was built.

After the Russian Civil War the (joint) Alekseevskogo, Berekskogo, Upper Bishkinskogo rural Soviets decided to relocate the peasants of these villages to the farm Likhachevo. So in 1924 a settlement was built in Likhachevo which originally was under the jurisdiction of the Upper Bishkinskyi village council. The founders of the village were migrants from the villages of Alexeevka, Bereka, Maslivka, and Upper-Bishkin. They built streets, such as 1 May Street. Agriculture and crafts schools were built, along with a primary school, which both children and adults attended.

In 1927 the village had 13 lots and 56 residents. In 1928, it was already 85 lots. The population increased as workers came to work at the brick and mechanical plant, as well as the mill. In September 1929, on the initiative of activists Tolokneeva and Fedoseenko, a gang was organized in the village. At the suggestion of porters, it was called "May 1" in honor of the international proletarian holiday. In early December 1929 Lihachevsky machine-tractor station was organized (one of the first in the Kharkiv district). Lihachevsky MTS first served 30 collective Alexeevski district.

A local newspaper Znamiya Truda is published here since October 1930.

According to the Soviet census of 1939, 640 people lived in Likhachevo.

On 20 October 1941 Axis troops occupied Likhachevo. 38 boys and girls were sent to work as slave laborers in Germany. 15 people from the village joined the partisans in Alexeevski district, whose leaders were Secretary of the Communist Party VS Ulyanov and executive committee chairman AG Buznyka.

Likhachevo repeatedly became the site of fierce fighting. During the war, it changed hands four times. On 16 September 1943 troops of the Steppe Front finally returned Likhachevo to Soviet control.

In 1946 a midwifery unit began to operate in the town. In 1948 a hospital was built, employing two doctors and three nurses.

In 1947 a kindergarten was built.

On 25 December 1948 Likhachevo became the center of the Council of Agriculture, who controlled the farm Pervomajskij, Our Way.

In 1950 a high school was built; its enrollment was 824 students and it employed 28 teachers.

On 24 June 1952 the settlement Likhachevo was renamed Pervomaiskyi.

In 1974 it was an urban-type settlement with several factories and 19400 people.

Until 18 July 2020, Pervomaiskyi was incorporated as a city of oblast significance and served as the administrative center of Pervomaiskyi Raion though it did not belong to the raion. In July 2020, as part of the administrative reform of Ukraine, which reduced the number of raions of Kharkiv Oblast to seven, the city of Pervomaiskyi was merged into Lozova Raion.

Transport

Pervomaiskyi is situated on the Pivdenna Zalisnitsa railway line. The railway station here is called "Likhachove," or, in Russian, "Likhachevo". Pervomaiskyi is also a main road hub which links many other cities like Lozova, Merefa, Balakliia and Izium together with the Kharkiv Oblast.

Economy
Pervomaiskyi was planned as a colony for the workers and clerical staff of the Khimprom chemical factory. Until the fall of the USSR in 1992, the city's inhabitants had good earnings, but afterwards, the city's economy collapsed. Many became jobless. However in the late 1990s some private companies moved into Pervomaiskyi.

Education
Pervomaiskyi originally had just two schools till 1977. Now it has 5 secondary schools; one is Russian-medium, and the rest are Ukrainian-medium. Pervomaiskyi has 6-day-care centres (detski sad), which are all Ukrainian-medium. There is one college offering technical education after 9th Class in many fields like cooking, tractor building, driving, heavy wheel driving, and field fertilizing.

Geography and climate
As Pervomaiskyi lies just around 95 km south of Kharkiv, its weather is similar. Pervomaiskyi's climate is moderate continental: cold and snowy winters, and hot summers.

Gallery

Media
Pervomaiskyi has two newspapers working within the region and city, and two private TV channels:

 Pervomaiskyi-Info, a free newspaper publishing advertisements and announcements since 2006
 Nadiya (Nadia) TV, established in 1993

See also
 Khim Prom
 List of cities in Ukraine by subdivision

References

Cities in Kharkiv Oblast
Soviet toponymy in Ukraine
Cities of regional significance in Ukraine